The plasmodiophores (also known as plasmophorids or plasmodiophorids) are a group of obligate endoparasitic protists belonging to the subphylum Endomyxa in Cercozoa. Taxonomically, they are united under a single family Plasmodiophoridae, order Plasmodiophorida, sister to the phagomyxids.

Ecology and pathology
Plasmodiophores are pathogenic for a wide range of organisms, but mainly green plants. The more commonly recognized are agents of plant diseases such as clubroot, powdery scab and crook root of watercress, or vectors for viruses that infect beets, peanut, monocots and potatoes, such as the potato mop-top virus or the beet necrotic yellow vein virus.

Taxonomy

History
The plasmodiophores have historically been regarded as Fungi. The first description of plasmodiophores as a taxonomic group was in 1885 by Zopf, who united two genera Plasmodiophora and Tetramyxa in a common family “Plasmodiophoreæ”, inside the group “Monadineæ”, as part of the division Myxomycetes. The family was renamed “Plasmodiophoraceae” in 1888 by Berlese. In 1892, Engler placed the family in its own class “Plasmodiophorales”, later renamed “Plasmodiophoromycetes” to fit nomenclature standards.

In 1969 Whittaker, in his five-kingdom system, elevated the group to a separate phylum “Plasmodiophoromycota”, acknowledging them as protists instead of fungi.

In 1993 Cavalier-Smith included the plasmodiophores and their sister group Phagomyxida in their current class, Phytomyxea, as part of a polyphyletic phylum called Opalozoa, which at the time contained a diverse assemblage of unrelated zooflagellates, opalines and proteomyxids. Eventually this phylum was discarded, and the name Opalozoa was modified to label a group inside the phylum Bigyra containing the opalines, bicosoecids and related organisms.

Finally, after phylogenetic analyses, in 2002 Cavalier-Smith placed all Phytomyxea, including plasmodiophores, in the subphylum Endomyxa, inside the rhizarian phylum Cercozoa.

Systematics
The number of genera varies between sources. There are three accepted genera in the group according to the WoRMS register: Plasmodiophora, Spongospora and Tetramyxa. Below is a complete list with genera that are not included in the register but appear in relevant sources:
Ligniera  (=Anisomyxa ; Rhizomyxa ; Sorolpidium )
Membranosorus 
Octomyxa 
Polymyxa 
Plasmodiophora  (=Ostenfeldiella )
Sorodiscus 
Sorosphaerula  (=Tuburcinia ; Sorosporium )
Spongospora  (=Clathrosorus )
Tetramyxa  (=Molliardia ; Thecaphora )
Woronina 

These genera were once considered plasmodiophores until they were excluded:
Cystospora  – possibly a physiological symptom.
Frankiella  – synonym of the bacteria Frankia.
Peltomyces  – excluded as unclassifiable.
Pyrrhosorus  – considered Labyrinthulida incertae sedis.
Sporomyxa  – excluded as unclassifiable.
Trematophlyctis  – a chytrid fungus.

References

Cercozoa families
Cercozoa orders
Endomyxa